MV Doulos Hope is a former cruise ship and future floating library owned by faith-based organisation Operation Mobilisation, which as of late 2022 is being prepared for operation by the German charity Gute Bücher für Alle.

Now named after the MV Doulos, the world's oldest active ocean-faring passenger ship until its retirement in December 2009, Doulos Hope was originally intended to sail as the Lady Sarah. For most of its career, it has served as a cruise ship under the names Aurora II, Megastar Aries, Genting World and The Taipan, predominantly for Hong Kong's Star Cruises.

After completion of a refit, Doulos Hope will be based in a Southeast Asian port from 2023. It will provide a floating library service in shallow-water ports to complement its much larger sister ship, the MV Logos Hope.

History 
Originally laid down on May 9, 1988 to designs first drawn up by Vikelas Architects of Athens, Greece, the Lady Sarah was built by Flender Werke of Lübeck, Germany alongside its sister ship the Lady Diana, nowadays known as the National Geographic Islander II.

Lady Sarah's original buyers, the Windsor Line, a privately owned, late-1980s startup targeting the North American yuppie market, proved unable to meet their obligations on its completion in 1989. The ship was eventually sold to the Bahamas-based New Frontier Cruise Line instead, and in mid-December 1991 it was renamed M/S Aurora II.

In July 1994, the ship was again sold to Hong Kong-based Star Cruises, where it would spend the remainder of its cruising career, and renamed M/S Megastar Aries. Two decades later, while still remaining with Star Cruises, it was renamed first as MV Genting World in July 2012, and then as MV The Taipan in October 2013.

After Star Cruises' parent company, Genting Hong Kong, filed for bankruptcy in January 2022, the cruise line folded. In May of the same year, the Taipan was sold to OM Ships International, the ships ministry arm of Christian outreach organisation Operation Mobilisation.

On May 25, 2022 Operation Mobilisation affiliate Gute Bücher für Alle accepted the ship in Penang, Malaysia, and it completed its sea trials on July 20. It then sailed to Singapore to continue a refurbishment which should conclude before the end of 2023.

Post-refurbishment, Doulos Hope is expected to be based in Southeast Asia and to stay in each port it visits for extended periods. It was purchased to give the organization access to new ports, thanks to the ship's shallower draft compared to its sister ships.

References 

1989 ships
Ships built in Lübeck